is a song recorded by Japanese music duo Yoasobi, featuring uncredited chorus of Plusonica, from their debut EP, The Book (2021). It was released on September 1, 2020, through Sony Music Entertainment Japan. Inspired by Tsubasa Yamaguchi's manga Blue Period and based on a story text Ao o Mikata ni, the song is described as "a cheering song that inspires listeners by immersing themselves in what they like and expressing what they see."

"Gunjō" was featured on Bourbon's Alfort Mini Chocolate advertisement. Additionally, it was also used as a theme of Dance One Project '21, a project that supports high school's dance club held by Nippon TV's morning show Sukkiri, and accompanied the 2022 94th High School baseball tournament entrance march. The music video was uploaded on December 1, and surpassed 100 million views on May 30, 2022. The English version, titled "Blue", was released on October 29, 2021, alongside the accompanying music video.

Live performances

Yoasobi performed "Gunjō" for the first time as a full group, including band members, and Plusonica on the YouTube channel The First Take, uploaded on February 26, 2021. After the EP The Book 2 announcement, Yoasobi appeared on Nippon TV's Best Artist 2021 and gave a televised debut performance of the song on November 17. They also performed the song at 72nd NHK Kōhaku Uta Gassen on December 31. The show depicted Ikura standing on the escalator to downstairs to perform on the stage, where Ayase, the band members, and the orchestra gathered there.

Track listing

 Digital download and streaming
  – 4:08

 Digital download and streaming (English version)
 "Blue" – 4:08

Credits and personnel

Credits adapted from The Book liner notes.

Song
 Ayase – songwriter, producer
 Ikura – vocals
 Alfort creative team – based story writer
 AssH – guitar
 Plusonica – chorus
 Takayuki Saitō – vocal recording
 Masahiko Fukui – mixing
 Niina Ai – artwork cover design

Music video
 Atsushi Makino – director
 Tōru Akamatsu – cinematographer
 Keigo Suzuki – lightning director
 Tomomi Kawano – art
 Toshirō Tabata – editor

Charts

Weekly charts

Year-end charts

Certifications

Release history

References

External links
 Ao o Mikata ni on Bourbon official website
 English translation of Make Blue Your Ally

2020 singles
2020 songs
Japanese-language songs
Sony Music Entertainment Japan singles
Yoasobi songs